Morbe Dam is a gravity dam on the Dhavari river near Khalapur, Raigad district in the state of Maharashtra, India. The Morbe lake is the main water source for the city of Navi Mumbai. It was built by the Water Supply and Sanitation Department of the Government of Maharashtra.

Construction of the Morbe dam began in 1999 to supply drinking water to the Navi Mumbai and Nhava Sheva regions.  According to the 1981 census, about 2,897 persons  living in 11 villages were affected by the project. In 2002, the Government permitted the Navi Mumbai Municipal Corporation to take over the Morbe dam.

Specifications

Purpose
 Water supply

Image gallery

See also
 List of dams and reservoirs in Maharashtra
 List of dams and reservoirs in India

References

Dams in Raigad district
Dams completed in 2006
2006 establishments in Maharashtra